Sympistis buto is a moth of the family Noctuidae first described by James T. Troubridge in 2008. It is found in North America, including California.

The wingspan is about 33 mm.

References

buto
Moths of North America
Fauna of California